Don or Donald Barker may refer to:

 Don Barker (actor) (born 1940), Australian actor
 Don Barker (politician) (1904–1956), Australian politician
 Donald Barker (1929–2016), Canadian CFL referee

Fictional characters
 Don Barker (Dream Team), a character in the TV series Dream Team